Parava is a 2017 Indian Malayalam-language drama film directed by Soubin Shahir with a script jointly written by Shahir and Muneer Ali. It is Shahir's directorial debut film and stars Amal Shah, Govind V. Pai and Shane Nigam, along with an extended guest appearance by Dulquer Salmaan. Principal photography began at Fort Kochi on 1 June 2016. The film was released on 21 September 2017.

Plot

The story takes place in Mattancherry and revolves around the life of two teen boys namely Haseeb and Irshad a.k.a. "Ichappi". Both of them are best friends and share a common interest in pigeon taming. Ichappi lives with his parents, his sister, and his brother Shane. Shane is indifferent and doesn't speak to anyone. The boys' love for birds is unconditional. They have local competitors, who have stolen their prized champion female pigeon. Though it is stated that Ichappi and Haseeb are not aware of this. When school reopens Ichappi is sad since he could not pass ninth grade. However, his new class teacher consoles him and offers to help him. Ichappi happens to meet Surumi, a new student in Haseeb's class, and falls for her. He notices that most of the boys are behind her. The boys while playing cricket encounters two drug addicts who had an impact on their past. Ichappi recollects the story.

A few years ago, there used to be a local club named Six Four Mattanchery led by Imran. It was a local cricket club, that competed in local matches. Ichappi's brother Shane was the star player of the club. Apart from being cricket mates, all the members of the club were best friends. The members of the club respected and loved Imran a lot. Shane meets a girl caretaker when Imran arranges a lunch for some orphans. He immediately falls for her. Imran, knowing all about Shane and the girl goes to  Shane's house and convinces Shane's parents for Shane's marriage. Shane's father asks Imran that there is no haste in getting him married, so let's just fix it for now. Once, one of the club's members Hakeem's sister Habeeba who works in a medical store is verbally assaulted by her boss. The club members, in the absence of Imran, vowed to seek revenge and bashes up the boss but accidentally get into a fight with some drug addicts and their gang. The addicts are thrashed in the chaos. They vow to take revenge against the club members. Imran discovers this and is infuriated by actions. However, while meeting them at the beach at night Imran and his club members is confronted by the addicts. Imran tries for a peace treaty but it results in vain. They get into a fight when Imran urges the club members to leave the place to which the members respond positively. However, Imran couldn't stop the goons and ended up getting killed. The club members and their parents mourn the loss of Imran. Shane who strongly believed that he was responsible for Imran's demise becomes violently emotional. Shane's father grieves the loss and orders all the other club members to never meet Shane since they left Imran alone. According to him, it's not something that friends did. After this, Shane and his father live in the same house but never talk. Shane isolates himself from everyone.

Ichappi recollects this story. Ichappi goes to school and proposes to Surumi by kissing her on her cheeks and is slapped in return. Ichappi gets nervous and fears that Surumi might spread this news to her parents as well as teachers. He fakes fever for the next few days and sends Haseeb to inquire about the happenings at school. Surumi confronts Haseeb and tells him to not worry and let Ichappi know that she isn't going to disclose it to anyone. Though Ichappi returns, he is saddened by the fact that Surumi has left the school under unknown circumstances. Icahppi and Haseeb under the pressure from a few other friends go to watch an adult movie. Icahppi feels uncomfortable all the time and upon reaching home, is confronted by an angry mother. His father asks him about the movie and to everyone's surprise just gives him advice to not repeat this. Upon questioning by the mother, he responds that being harsh with Shane never worked out as he wanted, he doesn't want his other son to stop speaking to him too. Hakeem's wedding is fixed. On the wedding day, Ichappi and Haseeb are shocked to find Surumi as the bride. From one of the children that roam around the competitor's place, they learn of the stolen bird. They retrieve their bird with the children's help. The local pigeon flying competition is on and the boys register their names for the competition. The birds and the whole cage disappear on the day of the competition. In tears, they fly the only pair they have. They had hidden the oldest pair in a different place. The boys can fly their birds for a long but are interrupted by Ichappi's father who scolds them for losing the birds. The birds fly away somewhere. Ichappi and Haseeb misunderstand that their rivals stole them but they admit they didn't. Shane discovers that the birds are in the clutches of the addicts who returned from jail and wanted revenge. Shane and his friends fight the goons. Shane tries to kill them but is stopped by his friends. His father and Hakeem's father come and thrash the goons. As the police arrive, Shane's father warns the Sub-Inspector that if they return, they will be killed. He then holds Shane's hand as they leave, symbolizing the end of the father-son dispute.

The club members are shown playing cricket. Shane is shown to have left his isolation and is back on track to continue his love story. A smiling Imran is shown sitting on the fence with some children watching the friends happily enjoying their unison. Ichappi and Haseeb continue their pigeon taming. The end shot showcases the pigeon (Parava) landing on Ichappi's hand.

Cast

Production 
After assisting several directors, Shahir started co-writing a script with friend Muneer Ali, who wrote the script for the segment "Sethulakshmi" in 5 Sundarikal in late 2015. In early 2016, Anwar Rasheed announced that he would produce Shahir's directorial debut. A casting call announcement was made on 23 April 2016 throughout social media seeking male and female actors between age 13 and 26.

Filming began in Qissa Cafe in Fort Kochi on 1 June 2016.

Release 
The film was released on 21 September 2017.

Box office 
The film was commercial success. The film collected ₹2.64 crores from first day of its release. The film collected ₹19.4 crores within 26 days of theatrical run. The film ran 100 days in theatres.

Soundtrack 
The original soundtrack and background score were composed by Rex Vijayan, with lyrics penned by Vinayak Sasikumar. An additional song titled "Vadakkele Pathoone", sung by K. E. Nabeesa, a native artist of Mattancheri, is also included in the film as title track.

Critical response  
Deepa Soman of Times of India rated the film 3/5: "Soubin Shahir... uses the not-yet-explored horizon of the sport as the backdrop to tell the story of his home turf, its many varied characters with painful pasts and present, bittersweet realities of the region and its portraits of friendships."

Behindwoods' reviewer rated the film 2.75/5 and wrote, "Performance is the magical touch that makes the simple story special. To be frank, even though Dulquer Salmaan is only there in the movie for a mere 25 minutes, Parava is truly his movie. The story of the film is deeply rooted in Imran, the character played by Dulquer who has effortlessly given his best, be it the body language or the accent of the local Mattancherry boy. Siddique and Shane Nigam have yet again delivered strong performances along with Soubin Shahir and Srinath Bhasi who essayed the roles of the antagonists to perfection. Actor Harisree Ashokan's son Arjun Ashokan and actor Zainudeen's son Zinil Zainudeen have performed neatly in important roles. The kids who played the pivotal roles of Irshad and Haseeb, the pigeon flyers also deserve a tap on their shoulders for their performances. Indrans, Harisree Ashokan, Shine Tom Chacko, Gregory, Jaffer Idukki, and Srinda Arhaan have done a good job in their supporting roles."

Baradwaj Rangan of Film Companion South wrote "Parava doesn’t find a balance between its two narratives, two moods, and indeed, two modes of storytelling: one small and intimate, the other broad and more commercial, with a score (by Rex Vijayan) that just won’t stop. And for a story that we entered through its children, it feels like a betrayal when they are abandoned for large stretches focusing on the grown-ups."

References

External links

2010s Malayalam-language films
2017 films
Films shot in Kochi
Films scored by Rex Vijayan